Brian Howard may refer to:

 Brian Howard (poet) (1905–1958), English poet
 Brian Howard (basketball) (born 1967), American former basketball player
 Brian Howard (English footballer) (born 1983), English footballer
 Brian Howard (rugby union) (born 1981), American rugby union and American football player
 Bryan Howard (athlete) (born 1976), American former sprinter
 Brian Howard (radio broadcaster), Australian radio announcer
 Brian Howard (Gaelic footballer), Gaelic footballer for Dublin
 Brian Howard, original member of the Apple Macintosh team
 Brian Howard, perpetrator of the 2014 Chicago Air Route Traffic Control Center fire